River Mahon flows from the Comeragh Mountains in County Waterford, Ireland.

Course
Falling down the 80-metre Mahon Falls and proceeding past a hawthorn "Fairy Tree", identified by ribbons tied to its branches (the tree was chopped down and replanted), the river then passes through the village of Mahon Bridge and on past Flahavan's Mill and under the 8-arched rail bridge in Kilmacthomas. The river is joined by the Ách Mór tributary river at Ballylaneen and ends its journey three miles further downstream at Bunmahon on Ireland's south coast. It drains into the region of the Atlantic Ocean known as the Celtic Sea.

Former mills
In former times, the river powered five different mills, one at Mahon Bridge, three at Kilmacthomas and one at Ballylaneen.

Sport
The river is popular with whitewater kayakers.  There has been no known source-to-sea descent to date but the river has been paddled from Mahon Bridge to the sea at Bonmahon by an international team of B1 and B2 kayakers in August 2012. On 21 October 2005, Michael Reynolds, a kayaker from Tramore, County Waterford, performed the only known descent in a kayak of the vertical 55 foot drop at the top of Mahon falls.

References

Mahon
Waterfalls of the Republic of Ireland